Asagena phalerata is a species of cobweb spider in the family Theridiidae. It is found throughout Europe and Eurasia, as far east as Korea. They are typically found in sparsely vegetated environments.

References

Theridiidae
Spiders described in 1801
Spiders of Asia
Spiders of Europe